On 20 February 1994 three armed militants  from Afghanistan took control of a school bus near the city of Peshawar in the North-West Frontier Province of Pakistan, close to the Afghan border. Seven teachers and about seventy children in the bus were taken hostage. The bus was driven to the Embassy of Afghanistan in Islamabad, where fifty-seven or sixty-one of the hostages were released. The hijackers made demands for food relief to be sent to Kabul, for a ransom, and for safe conduct and a helicopter to take them to Afghanistan.

On the following day, 21 February 1994, units of the Pakistani Special Services Group attacked the Afghan embassy, killed the three hostage-takers and rescued the remaining six or sixteen hostages, who were unharmed.

See also
2010 Kurram agency mass kidnapping
2014 Peshawar school massacre
List of kidnappings
List of solved missing person cases: pre-2000

References

1990s missing person cases
1994 crimes in Pakistan
1994 in international relations
Afghanistan–Pakistan relations
Crime in Peshawar
February 1994 crimes
February 1994 events in Asia
Formerly missing people
Hijacking
History of education in Pakistan
Kidnapped children
Kidnapped Pakistani people
Kidnappings in Pakistan
Missing person cases in Pakistan
Political history of Pakistan
School massacres in Pakistan